The 2019 Henderson Tennis Open was a professional tennis tournament played on outdoor hard courts. It was the eleventh edition of the tournament which was part of the 2019 ITF Women's World Tennis Tour. It took place in Las Vegas, United States between 4 and 10 November 2019.

Singles main-draw entrants

Seeds

 1 Rankings are as of 21 October 2019.

Other entrants
The following players received wildcards into the singles main draw:
  Jamie Loeb
  Grace Min
  Katerina Stewart
  Fanny Stollár

The following player received a special exempt into the singles main draw:
  Alexa Glatch

The following players received entry from the qualifying draw:
  Vladica Babić
  Charlotte Chavatipon
  Quinn Gleason
  María Gutiérrez Carrasco
  Alycia Parks
  Natasha Subhash
  Stephanie Wagner
  Marcela Zacarías

The following player received entry as a lucky loser:
  Giuliana Olmos

Champions

Singles

 Mayo Hibi def.  Anhelina Kalinina, 6–2, 5–7, 6–2

Doubles

 Olga Govortsova /  Mandy Minella def.  Sophie Chang /  Alexandra Mueller, 6–3, 6–4

References

External links
 2019 Henderson Tennis Open at ITFtennis.com
 Official website

2019 ITF Women's World Tennis Tour
2019 in American tennis
November 2019 sports events in the United States
2019 in sports in Nevada